Forestry Commission Scotland was the division of the UK Forestry Commission responsible for forestry in Scotland until 2019, when it was dissolved.

Forestry Commission was the body responsible for forestry in Scotland prior to 2019, and continues to be responsible for forestry in England
Forestry and Land Scotland is the body now responsible for the management of Scotland's national forest estate
Scottish Forestry for the body now responsible for policy and regulation of the forestry sector in Scotland

Scotland's Environmental and Rural Services